Gerald Ellis Hannahs (born March 6, 1952) is an American former professional baseball pitcher who worked in 16 career games in Major League Baseball for the Montreal Expos and Los Angeles Dodgers in parts of four seasons between  and . He was born in Binghamton, New York.

Career
Hannahs played college baseball for the University of Arkansas. He went undrafted and was signed as an amateur free agent by the Expos on July 5, 1974. In his third pro season, Hannahs posted a 20–6 won–lost record for Montreal's Double-A affiliate, the Québec Metros. He led the Eastern League in both victories and strikeouts. Recalled by Montreal in September, he started three games and defeated both the St. Louis Cardinals and New York Mets; in the latter contest, he allowed only one earned run in six innings pitched.

On April 16, 1977, Hannahs became the first Expos pitcher to earn a victory at Olympic Stadium, defeating the Philadelphia Phillies 4–3, and allowing three runs in 6 innings.

However, Hannahs' win that day, the third of his MLB career, would prove to be his last in the majors. He dropped his next seven decisions as a member of the Expos and Dodgers over his final 11 appearances. He retired from professional baseball in 1981. As a big-leaguer, he compiled a 3–7 won–lost mark and a 5.07 earned run average; he earned one save as a relief pitcher. In 71 innings pitched, he permitted 76 hits (including 11 home runs) and 42 bases on balls, recording an equal number of strikeouts.

His son, Dusty, played basketball for the Razorbacks and in the National Basketball Association.

References

External links

1953 births
Living people
Albuquerque Dukes players
American expatriate baseball players in Canada
Arkansas Razorbacks baseball players
Baseball players from New York (state)
Denver Bears players
Gulf Coast Expos players
Los Angeles Dodgers players
Major League Baseball pitchers
Memphis Chicks players
Montreal Expos players
Québec Carnavals players
Quebec Metros players
San Antonio Dodgers players
Sportspeople from Binghamton, New York
Toledo Mud Hens players
West Palm Beach Expos players
Sportspeople from Little Rock, Arkansas